The M5 Legacy Way (formerly Northern Link Tunnel) is a  long tunnel linking the Western Freeway at Toowong and the Inner City Bypass at Kelvin Grove, Brisbane. The project consisted of two bored tunnels carrying two motorway grade lanes of traffic in each direction. It opened on 25 June 2015 and is the fourth of five components of Brisbane City Council's TransApex Project. The tunnels will be tolled for approximately 45 years.

The Environmental Impact Statement was released for public comment in September 2008 and approved in April 2010. Construction commenced in April 2011 with original plans to open the tunnel to traffic in late 2014. It carries approximately 20,000 vehicles a day and has reduced travel time between the Centenary Bridge and the Inner City Bypass by 71%.

The project was funded through council borrowings, together with a state and federal government contribution.

Tender process
Three consortia were shortlisted and invited to submit proposals in December 2009:

Northern Direct (a joint venture of Bouygues, Laing O'Rourke, Transfield Services)
Transcity (a joint venture of Acciona, BMD, Ghella)
 Leighton Baulderstone Razel joint venture

The tenders for the design, construction, operation and maintenance of the tunnels for up to 20 years were submitted on 12 May 2010, however on 5 July the Brisbane City Council announced that the Leightons Baulderstone Razel joint venture bid would not be considered.

On 20 September 2010, Lord Mayor Campbell Newman announced that the winner of the tender process was Transcity, a joint venture between Acciona, BMD Constructions and tunnelling specialist Ghella.

Name change
In November 2010 the Brisbane City Council revealed that the Northern Link would be named Legacy Way in honour of the men and women serving in the Australian Defence Force. One cent of every toll (equating to $5.5 million over the lifetime of the road) will go to Legacy Australia, an Australian volunteer organisation caring for the families of deceased and incapacitated military veterans.

Tunnel design

Features
Some design features include 36 underground cross passages, spaced every 120 m, a longitudinal ventilation system, fire protection and safety management systems and free-flow tolling.

Alteration

In April 2012 Brisbane City Council Lord Mayor Graham Quirk was quoted as stating that the former Labor state government had failed to support during the design phase of the project a busway connection linking Legacy Way's eastern end with the Northern Busway. Despite a change in state government, the minister responsible for the Department of Transport & Main Roads, Scott Emerson, could not justify a busway connection at a cost of $30 million. Although the inclusion of a busway connection represented only 0.25% of the project's overall cost, the LNP state government were at the time focused on reducing the Queensland government debt.

In November 2013 The Queensland Minister for Transport & Main Roads announced a plan to connect buses from the Underground Bus and Train Tunnel project with Legacy Way.

In April 2014 Queensland Premier Campbell Newman confirmed a plan to shorten the travel time of Transport for Brisbane's western suburbs bus routes by connecting Legacy Way with the Bus and Train (BaT) Tunnel project. By 2020 re-routed bus services will save 15 minutes per journey. Design options involving ramps or bridges linking both tunnels were being considered.

Ventilation
There are two ventilation shafts. The western shaft is located in the Brisbane Botanic Gardens, Mount Coot-tha with the ventilation station underground. The eastern shaft is located in Victoria Park (which now includes a former golf course) near the Inner City Bypass, Kelvin Grove, and its ventilation station is partially built into an existing hill.

Construction

Tunnel boring
Two Herrenknecht Double Shield tunnel boring machines (TBMs) bored from the Mount Coot-tha roundabout, Toowong, toward the Inner City Bypass, Kelvin Grove. The TBMs were named Annabell and Joyce, as a tribute to Legacy Australia. Annabell is named after Annabell MacKinney, the daughter of the late Lance Corporal Jared MacKinney who was killed in action in the war in Afghanistan in 2010.  Joyce is named after Joyce Tweddell, a nurse during World War II who showed immense courage after being held as a prisoner of war in Sumatra for 3 years before returning home and going on to become Queensland's chief radiographer at the Royal Brisbane and Women's Hospital.

Progress
Joyce TBM concluded the boring of the eastbound tunnel on 24 April 2013, taking 7 months to reach breakthrough. Annabell TBM concluded boring of the westbound tunnel on 13 June 2013, taking 10 months to reach breakthrough. Both TBMs bored in the same direction.

Source

Spoil
Spoil created from the excavation earthworks is being deposited at the Mount Coot-tha Quarry. An 870 m long conveyor tunnel transports excavated material from the western tunnel entrance to the quarry.

Source (p.119)

Tunnel operator
On 16 July 2013 it was reported that Queensland Motorways had acquired a 50-year lease to toll, operate and maintain Legacy Way from Brisbane City Council. The following July, Queensland Motorways was acquired by Transurban.

The majority of the toll revenue will go to Transurban with Brisbane City Council expecting to receive between $1.08 billion and $1.58 billion by 2020.

On 18 September 2013 an informal review conducted by the Australian Competition & Consumer Commission concluded that the acquisition would not result in a substantial lessening of competition in any of the relevant markets.

Tolls
The tunnel is part of the Linkt network (formerly go via), and the toll is collected as vehicles pass under a gantry. The tolls cost for cars at the time of opening in June 2015 is $3.00.

Tunnel walk-through event
A family-friendly walk through Legacy Way before it opened to traffic took place on 31 May 2015, when more than 20,000 people, including many young children, passed through the tunnel. The event was only accessible by public transport, with free bus pick-up and drop-off points located throughout the city and multiple bus stops located inside the tunnel.

References

Further reading

External links

 Legacy Way Website (Queensland Motorways)
 Transcity website (construction contractor)
 TransityJV YouTube channel
 Northern Link Environmental Impact Statement website
 Northern Link Environmental Impact Statement documents
 Peak Oil and the Northern Link Environmental Impact Statement

Buildings and structures in Brisbane
Tunnels in Queensland
Toll tunnels in Australia
Roads in Brisbane
2015 establishments in Australia
Highways in Queensland
Tunnels completed in 2015